Download Series Volume 8 is a live album by the rock band the Grateful Dead. It was released as a digital download on December 6, 2005.  It contains most of the concert that the band performed on December 10, 1973 at the Charlotte Coliseum in Charlotte, North Carolina.

The songs omitted from the album are "Jack Straw", "Tennessee Jed", "El Paso", and "Brown-Eyed Women" from the first set, and "Me and My Uncle" from the second set.

Volume 8 was mastered in HDCD format by Jeffrey Norman.

Track listing

Disc one
First set:
 "Bertha" (Garcia, Hunter) - 7:01
 "Mexicali Blues" (Weir, Barlow) - 4:12
 "Deal" (Garcia, Hunter) - 4:50
 "Big River" (Cash) - 4:54
 "Don't Ease Me In" (Trad. Arr. By Grateful Dead) - 4:03
 "Playing In The Band" (Weir, Hart, Hunter) - 20:52
Second set:
 "Promised Land" (Berry) - 3:40
 "Peggy-O" (Trad. Arr. By Grateful Dead) - 6:03
 "Row Jimmy" (Garcia, Hunter) - 9:49
 "Me and Bobby McGee" (Kristofferson, Foster) - 5:59
 "Big Railroad Blues" (Lewis, Arr. By Grateful Dead) - 4:26

Disc two
 "Truckin' " > (Garcia, Lesh, Weir, Hunter) - 9:00
 "Nobody's Fault But Mine" > (Johnson) - 5:07
 "Eyes Of The World" > (Garcia, Hunter) -13:20
 "Brokedown Palace" (Garcia, Hunter) - 6:23
 "China Cat Sunflower" > (Garcia, Hunter) - 5:16
 "I Know You Rider" (Trad. Arr. By Grateful Dead) - 8:41
 "Sugar Magnolia" > (Weir, Hunter) - 6:16
 "Goin' Down The Road Feeling Bad" > (Trad. Arr. By Grateful Dead) - 8:46
 "Sunshine Daydream" (Weir, Hunter) - 3:11
Encore:
 "Casey Jones" (Garcia, Hunter) - 7:26

Personnel
Grateful Dead
 Jerry Garcia – lead guitar, vocals 
 Keith Godchaux – piano 
 Bill Kreutzmann – drums 
 Phil Lesh – electric bass
 Bob Weir – rhythm guitar, vocals
Production
 Kidd Candelario – recording
 Jeffrey Norman – mastering

References

08
2005 live albums